HMAS Medea was an auxiliary minesweeper of the Royal Australian Navy (RAN) between 1942 until 1946. Built in 1912 for the Ocean Steam Ship Co. she was sold to the Straits Steam Ship Co. in 1925. She was requisitioned by the Royal Navy in 1939 and converted into an auxiliary minesweeper and named HMS Circe. She was transferred to the Royal Australian Navy in 1942 and renamed HMAS Medea until she was returned to her owners in 1946. She was sold and was scuttled off Sydney on 20 January 1948.

Construction and design
Built in 1912 by Taikoo Dockyard & Engineering Co., Hong Kong as a passenger cargo vessel for the Ocean Steam Ship Co. based at Singapore.

Operational service
She plied the Singapore straits as part of the Blue Funnel Line until she was requisitioned in 1939 by the Royal Navy and conversion into an auxiliary minesweeper and commissioned as HMS Circe. She was transferred to the Royal Australian Navy in 1942 and renamed HMAS Medea upon commissioning on 6 July 1942.

Fate
She was returned to her owners in 1946 and was sold for breaking up at Drummoyne, Sydney. Her hull was scuttled off Sydney on 20 January 1948.

Citations

References
https://web.archive.org/web/20110419115519/http://www.red-duster.co.uk/BLUEFUN12.htm
http://www.navyhistory.org.au/category/navy-day-by-day/1942/page/3/

1912 ships
Minesweepers of the Royal Navy
Minesweepers of the Royal Australian Navy
Scuttled vessels of New South Wales
Iron and steel steamships of Australia